A fun slide, also known as the astroglide slide, or cascade slide, is an amusement ride. A rider walks up the stairs to get to the top of this slide along with a mat. The rider places the mat on the slide, sits on the mat, and slides down the ride.

Fun slides come in different lengths and numbers of slide lines including the State Fair 5 lane, 90 foot 3/4 lane, and the 65 foot 3/4 lane. The ride can be made faster using a beeswax polish or can be slowed using a sugar-based soda. A coconut matting lies on the bottom of the ride to bring the riders to a safe stop.

References

External links

Amusement rides by type
Gravity rides